The Flag of Birmingham may refer to:

Flag of Birmingham (England)
Flag of Birmingham, Alabama

See also
 Birmingham (disambiguation)